Longtan District (龍潭區) may refer to:

 Longtan District, Jilin City, district in Jilin City, Jilin, China (People's Republic of China)
 Longtan District, Taoyuan, district in Taoyuan, Taiwan (Republic of China)